Art has existed in Iceland since the first settlements, but it was only at the beginning of the 20th century that Icelandic artists came to an international reputation. Mostly, they had studied in other countries, e.g. in Denmark.

The most important motifs for Icelandic painters were the nature of their home country and the human being, but they also used mythical and supernatural themes as well as socio-realistic motives.

Around 1960 the Swiss-German artist Dieter Roth moved to Iceland. His engagement with the Icelandic art scene was of great importance in introducing movements such as conceptual art, Fluxus, happenings, body art, life art and social sculpture, which since have formed a basis for Icelandic Contemporary Art.

Painters

 Ásgrímur Jónsson (1876–1958)
 Jóhannes Geir Jónsson (1927–2003)
 Jóhannes Sveinsson Kjarval (1885–1972)
 Þórarinn Þorláksson (1867–1924)
 Jón Stefánsson (1881–1962)
 Einar Jónsson (1863–1922)
 Guðmundur Thorsteinsson (1891–1924)
 Gunnlaugur Scheving (1904–1972)
 Þorvaldur Skúlason (1906–1984)
 Karl Kvaran (1924–1989)
 Svavar Guðnason (1909–1988)
 Nína Tryggvadóttir (1913–1968)
 Louisa Matthíasdóttir (1917–2000)
 Erró (Guðmundur Guðmundson, born 1932)
 Bjarni Jónsson (artist) (1934–2008)
 Haukur Halldórsson (born 1937)
 Einar Hákonarson (born 1945)
 Jón Óskar (born 1954)
 Brian Pilkington (born 1950)

Contemporary artists

 Heimir Björgúlfsson (born 1975)
 Gabríela Fridriksdóttir (born 1971)
 Kristján Guðmundsson (born 1941)
Gunnhildur Hauksdóttir (born 1972)
 Ragnar Kjartansson (born 1976)
 Steina Vasulka (born Steinunn Briem Bjarnadottir in 1940)
 Hugleikur Dagsson (born in 1977)
 Sigurður Guðjónsson (born 1975)

Sculptors

 Ólafur Elíasson (1967–), Danish–Icelandic
 Johann Eyfells (1923–2019)
 Gerður Helgadóttir (1928–1975)
 Einar Jónsson | Einar Jónsson (1874–1954)
 Gunnfríður Jónsdóttir (1889–1968)
 Ríkharður Jónsson (1888–1977)
 Páll Guðmundsson (born 1959)
 Þorbjörg Pálsdóttir (1915–2009)
 Nína Sæmundsson (1892–1965)
 Katrín Sigurdardóttir (born 1967)
 Ásmundur Sveinsson (1893–1982)
 Steinunn Thorarinsdottir (born 1955)

Photographers
 Ragnar Axelsson (RAX)
 Sigfús Eymundsson (1837–1911)
 Rebekka Guðleifsdóttir (born 1978)

Architects
 Guðjón Samúelsson (1887–1950)
 Gísli Halldórsson (1914–1998)

Actors

 Anita Briem
 Baltasar Kormákur
 Edda Björgvinsdóttir
 Heida Reed
 Hera Hilmar
 Hilmir Snær Guðnason
 Ingvar E. Sigurðsson
 Magnús Scheving
 Stefán Karl Stefánsson
 Steinunn Ólína Þorsteinsdóttir
 Tómas Lemarquis

References

Icelandic
Artists
Icelandic artists